Ichiban Ushiro no Dai Maō a 2010 anime television series based on the light novels written by Shotaro Mizuki and illustrated by Souichi Itō, published by Hobby Japan under its HJ Bunko imprint. The anime covers the first 5 novel volumes. Produced by Artland, the series is directed by Takashi Watanabe, series composition by Takao Yoshioka, music by Tatsuya Kato, and characters by Miyabi Ozeki and Toshimitsu Kobayashi. The series revolves around Akuto Sai, a young man who transfers to Constant Magick Academy, aspiring to become a high priest. His life takes a sudden turn when it is revealed that he will become Demon King in the future, and he soon becomes the target of many students.

The series broadcast on Tokyo MX between April 3, 2010 to June 19, 2010, with subsequent broadcasts on Chiba TV, TV Kanagawa, AT-X, Sun TV, TV Aichi, Nico Nico Channel, and ShowTime, Inc. Simulcasts of the series are provided by Crunchyroll and Anime Network on its video website. The series aired uncensored on AT-X, while it was heavily censored on other networks. Six DVD and Blu-ray Disc volumes were released by Marvelous Entertainment between June 25 and November 25, 2010, each containing an original video animation called . The series became part of Anime Network's Video On Demand service beginning on October 21, 2010. The series is licensed in North America by Sentai Filmworks under the title Demon King Daimao, and Section23 Films released the complete series with an English dub on Blu-ray and DVD on June 14, 2011.

The opening theme for Episodes 2 through 11 and the ending theme for Episode 1 & 12 is "REALOVE:REALIFE" by Sphere, while the ending theme for Episodes 2 through 11 is "Everyday Sunshine Line!" by Natsuko Aso.

Episodes

Specials

References

External links

Ichiban Ushiro no Dai Maō at Marvelous Entertainment 

Demon King Daimao